Walter Alejandro Gargano Guevara (born 23 July 1984) is a Uruguayan footballer who plays as a defensive midfielder for Peñarol.

Club career

Youth career
Gargano started playing football at age of three and joined the now defunct youth club Centella in Paysandú. In the youth club, he was in the midfield position. While in the youth, Gargano played against his future club Danubio, where he was soon discovered by the club and joined them.

Danubio
Gargano started his professional career with Danubio in 2003 and made his league debut at age of nineteen. He won two national titles with Danubio (2004 (which was his first season winning it) and 2006–07). He made 102 appearances and scored three times and was a regular player in the first team.

Napoli
On 30 June 2007, Gargano agreed a transfer from Uruguayan club Danubio to newly promoted Napoli for a fee of £2m signing a five-year contract. He made his first appearance for the club in a 4–0 win over Cesena and made his Serie A debut on 26 August 2007 against Cagliari. On 20 October 2007, he scored his first goal in a 4–4 draw against Roma and netted the following week, in a 3–1 win over Juventus. In his first season, he made 34 appearances scoring twice. Also during his first season, Gargano received two sending offs, a second bookable offence in a 5–2 loss against Milan on 13 January 2008 and three months on, a straight red card in a 2–1 win over Parma on 20 April 2008.

The following season, Gargano made his UEFA Cup debut in a 3–2 win over Benfica in the first round. However, in the second leg, Benfica would win 2–0, eliminating Napoli. On 29 September 2008, he provided a winning goal for Germán Denis, scoring the only goal in the game against Bologna. In the mid second season, he suffered a fractured foot during training in March 2009 and was sidelined for two months. He recovered in time to feature in the last two games of the Serie A season, against Catania and Chievo.

In January 2010, Gargano renewed his contract with Napoli until 2015. He made his 100th appearance for the club in a 3–1 loss against Fiorentina on 13 March 2010. The following season, he played all six matches in Napoli's Europa League campaign as the club advanced to the knockout stage, only to be eliminated by Villarreal. He continued to establish himself in the first team, playing as a defensive midfielder.

The following season, Gargano was linked with a move while the arrival of Gökhan Inler from Udinese threatened his first-team place. Eventually, he remained at the club. Having placed third in the league the previous, the club entered the Champions League. He made his debut in the Champions League in a 1–1 draw against Manchester City and played all seven matches, with Napoli progressing through the knockout stage before being eliminated by Chelsea. Gargano was involved in the squad assisting a goal for Edinson Cavani, who scored a hat-trick in a 3–1 win over defending champions Milan. On 21 December 2011, he scored his first goal in a 6–1 win against Genoa, ending his four-year goal drought. Three months later, on 9 March 2012, he scored his second of the season in a 6–3 win over Cagliari. At the end of the season, Napoli won the Coppa Italia final in a 2–0 win over Juventus in which Gargano did not feature after picking up his second yellow card in the semi final match against Siena.

Internazionale
Gargano signed for Internazionale on 23 August 2012 on loan for €1.25m with an option to make the move permanent for €8.25m. Three days after his move, he made his debut in the opening game of the season in a 3–0 win over Pescara.

Monterrey
In the summer of 2015 Gargano signed for Mexican club Monterrey after eight years in Italian football joining the club alongside Argentine striker Rogelio Funes Mori. He played at the inauguration of the BBVA Bancomer stadium which is the new home stadium for Monterrey. He currently plays in the midfield alongside club veteran Luis Perez.

International career
Gargano represented his nation at the 2007 Copa América, where they finished in fourth place.
He was included in the Uruguayan squad for the 2010 World Cup, where he came on as a substitute on several occasions, as Uruguay finished fourth in the tournament.
In 2011, he was part of the Copa América winning Uruguay squad, and scored in the penalty shoot-out victory against Argentina in the quarter-finals. He also took part at the 2013 FIFA Confederations Cup, where Uruguay finished fourth; in the bronze medal match against Italy, following a 2–2 draw after extra-time, he missed the decisive penalty in his nation's 3–2 shoot-out defeat. He later took part at the 2014 FIFA World Cup.

Personal life
Walter is married to former Napoli teammate Marek Hamšík's sister, Michaela who is Slovak. Together, the couple have three children: Matias, born on 7 May 2010, Thiago, born on 7 April 2012, and Leo, born on 27 November 2017.

Career statistics

Club

International
Source:

Honours
Napoli
 Coppa Italia: 2011–12
 Supercoppa Italiana: 2014

Peñarol
Uruguayan Primera División: 2018, 2021
 Supercopa Uruguaya: 2018, 2022

Uruguay
Copa América: 2011

References

External links
 Player profile on Napoli's official website
 

1984 births
Living people
Uruguayan people of Italian descent
Uruguayan people of Spanish descent
Uruguayan footballers
Danubio F.C. players
S.S.C. Napoli players
Inter Milan players
Parma Calcio 1913 players
C.F. Monterrey players
Peñarol players
Uruguay international footballers
2007 Copa América players
2010 FIFA World Cup players
2011 Copa América players
Uruguayan Primera División players
Serie A players
Liga MX players
Expatriate footballers in Italy
Expatriate footballers in Mexico
Uruguayan expatriate footballers
Uruguayan expatriate sportspeople in Italy
Association football midfielders
2013 FIFA Confederations Cup players
2014 FIFA World Cup players
Copa América-winning players
Footballers from Paysandú